In the United Kingdom, foundation schools bring together medical schools, the local deanery, trusts (acute, mental health and PCTs) and other organisations (e.g. hospices) to offer foundation doctors training in a range of different settings and clinical environments in order to complete the Foundation Programme. The schools are administered by a centrally located group of staff members which is supported by the deanery.

References

External links
 NHS Foundation Schools List
 UK Foundations School Chooser

Medical education in the United Kingdom